Maximilien Polak (December 5, 1930 – December 27, 2022) was a Dutch-born Canadian judge and politician in the province of Quebec. Dutch-born and raised, Polak arrived in Canada in 1952, where he attended the Université de Montréal, earning a degree in law in 1958.

Polak served as a municipal court judge in Côte Saint-Luc from 1969 to 1979.

In 1981, Polak ventured into politics, and was elected to the Quebec National Assembly as a Liberal, representing the district of Sainte-Anne. He was re-elected in 1985, and served as the deputy whip. In 1989, he chose not to run again, and instead became a judge of Quebec Court. He served as a judge from 1991 to 2000, at which point he retired; however, he served as an "ad hoc" judge from 2001 to 2005.

Polak's son, Michael, also a lawyer, serves as the Honorary Consul General of the Netherlands in Montreal. His daughter, Carolyn, also a lawyer, specializes in family law. 

Polak died on December 27, 2022, at the age of 92.

Electoral record (incomplete)

References

1930 births
2022 deaths
Judges in Quebec
Dutch emigrants to Canada
People from Leiden
Quebec Liberal Party MNAs
Université de Montréal alumni